The First Slam Dunk is a 2022 Japanese animated sports film written and directed by Takehiko Inoue, produced by Toei Animation and Dandelion Animation Studio. It is based on Inoue's Slam Dunk manga series. It was released theatrically in Japan on December 3, 2022.

In 2023, The First Slam Dunk won the Japan Academy Prize for Animation of the Year.

Synopsis
The film follows Ryota Miyagi, the point guard of Shohoku high-school's basketball team. He had a brother, Sota, who was three years older than him, and who inspired his love for basketball. Ryota and his teammates Hanamichi Sakuragi, Takenori Akagi, Hisashi Mitsui, and Kaede Rukawa challenge the inter-high basketball champions, the Sannoh school.

Cast

Production

Development and pre-production
Back in 2003, Toshiyuki Matsui, a producer from Toei Animation, approached Inoue's office to ask if he was willing to make a Slam Dunk movie that would continue the story after where the TV Anime left off. It was due to the popular reception of the anime's DVD-box; however, the offer was rejected. Six years later, in 2009, Inoue's office approached Matsui to send a proposal regarding the project. Then, Matsui assembled a team led by Naoki Miyahara and Toshio Ohashi that, over a period of nearly 5 years, developed proposal prototype videos of the visual look that can be created using 3DCG, as it appeared to be more realistic to move the large number of characters together in the basketball court more than hand-drawn 2D animation. The second prototype, which cost nearly as much as a whole movie, was rejected, as it strayed far off Inoue's vision and did not evoke that the characters were "alive". The third prototype, which had to be the final one, combined 3DCG with 2D-animation, and it was the version that laid the infrastructure for Inoue's work as a director.

In December 2014, during a dinner with Matsui, Inoue gave the greenlight to the film. Matsui, then, suggested that Inoue should write the script and direct, as he was the person to be trusted the most with the characters' dialogue and their visual appearance and expression. After Inoue accepted, he began working on the script in January 2015. In 2018, work on the motion capture and models commenced.

Production
On January 6, 2021, Inoue suddenly announced on his Twitter account that the movie was in production. Then, on August 13, 2021, Inoue was revealed to be the screenwriter and director of the film, along with other production staff members such as Yasuyuki Ebara as character designer/animation director and Naoki Miyahara, Katsuhiko Kitada, Toshio Ohashi, Yasuhiro Motoda, Fumihiko Suganuma, and Haruka Kamatani as sequence directors.

On July 1, 2022, five new character posters were installed in theaters across Japan, where the release date of December 3, 2022 and the title The First Slam Dunk were officially announced. The official website of the film held interviews with multiple production staff members, where they shared their contribution to the film and Inoue's requests for the film. According to character designer/general animation director Yasuyuki Ebara, Inoue wanted the character designs to follow his recent illustrations shown in the new Slam Dunk Refurbished edition volumes released in 2018, instead of the older designs of the manga. The film's art director Kazuo Ogura and color designer Shiori Furusyo stated that Inoue wanted to express the world of the manga moving and, therefore, he generally wanted to use desaturated colors. Also, they mentioned that the movie was a blend of 3DCG for the basketball scenes and hand-drawn 2D animation for daily life scenes. Therefore, the film tries to bring the best of both worlds.
On that note, CG director Daiki Nakazawa stated the same thing, but mentioned that there are some 2D basketball scenes where the animators used the motion capture for reference to portray basketball movements with much realism as possible. The movie, also, used the assistance of professional basketball players to review how the game was depicted.

When asked about his reason for involving himself in the film, Inoue stated that he was encouraged by the enthusiasm of the people who worked on the prototype versions and after seeing a good image of Sakuragi's face, he thought that getting himself involved would make it even better. He, also, stated that his main job as a director was to make sure that blood was injected into the characters and that they were brought to life. He corrected and retouched scenes, both in 3D and 2D, and drew multiple storyboards for the film. As for his aims regarding the story, he mentioned that he aimed for the film to be a new look into Slam Dunk, from a new perspective, where instead of focusing on a protagonist with endless possibilities and great potential, he wanted to focus on the perspective of living with pain and overcoming it. Therefore, he chose the title The First Slam Dunk, as it is a movie that wants the audience familiar with the story to experience it as if it was their first time, and those unfamiliar with it to have it be their first Slam Dunk experience. On the subject of changing the TV anime's voice actors, he stated that if he were to ask them to return, he would have asked them to throw away their perception and understanding of the characters that they professionally cultivated over the years, which is something he could not do. With the new voice actors, he put emphasis on the quality of their natural voices more than their acting skills.

Music
 Opening theme song: "Love Rockets" by The Birthday.
 Ending theme song: "Dai Zero Kan" 10-Feet.

Release
The first teaser trailer of the film was released on July 7, 2022; and a full trailer was released on November 4, 2022. The film was released theatrically in Japan by Toei Company on December 3, 2022, through regular and IMAX screenings. In the Philippines, the film was released by Pioneer Films on February 1, 2023. Also, this movie has several locally dubbed versions in overseas regions, such as Hong Kong, South Korea and Taiwan.

Reception

Box office
As of February 7, 2023, The First Slam Dunk grossed  in Japan.

The film debuted at number one at the Japanese box office, and grossed billion (million) during its first two days. The film remained at the top spot in its second and third weekends, grossing ¥825 million ($6 million) and ¥547 million ($3.99 million).

In South Korea, the film became the highest-selling anime film of all time, earning over $30.38 million by March 2023.

Accolades
The First Slam Dunk was awarded the Japan Academy Prize for Animation of the Year at the 46th Japan Academy Film Prize in 2023. The film won the Okawa-Fukiya Award at the Niigata International Animation Film Festival 2023.

References

External links
 Official website 
 
 

2022 anime films
Animated sports films
Anime films based on manga
Basketball films
Basketball in anime and manga
Films set in Kanagawa Prefecture
Japan Academy Prize for Animation of the Year winners
Japanese animated feature films
Japanese high school films
Japanese sports films
Slam Dunk (manga)
Takehiko Inoue
Toei Animation films